The Loile River is a tributary of the Momboyo River in the Democratic Republic of the Congo.

The Loile forms in the Salonga National Park and flows in the generally northwest direction to its confluence with the Luilaka.
The Momboya forms to the southeast of the village of Waka, Equateur, just over the border in Tshuapa, where the Luilaka River is joined from the right by the Loile River at Bakako.

Notes

Sources

Rivers of the Democratic Republic of the Congo